Sabo may refer to:

People
Sabo (street artist)
Sabo Bobaljević
Sabo Romo, musician
Albert F. Sabo (1920–2002), judge
Chris Sabo (born 1962), baseball player
Dave Sabo (born 1964), musician
Jean-Philippe Sabo (born 1987), French footballer
John P. Sabo (1900-1958), American college football and basketball coach
László Rác Szabó 
Leslie H. Sabo, Jr., Medal of Honor recipient
Martin Olav Sabo (1938–2016), American politician
Michael Sabo (born 1930), identity theft consultant
Nassirou Sabo, Nigerian politician
Radu Sabo (born 1971), Romanian footballer
Yozhef Sabo (born 1940), Ukrainian footballer
Zoltan Sabo (1972–2020), Serbian footballer
Sabo Bakin Zuwo (1934–1989), Nigerian politician

Places
Al Sabo Preserve
Martin Olav Sabo Bridge
Sabo Quarter, Migrant Hausa settlements in Yorubaland
Sabo River

Other uses
Sabo, turnip milk
Sabo, a saboteur or shortened form of sabotage
Sabo (web series), a reality prank web series produced by Toggle, Singapore
Sabo, a fictional character from One Piece